Parancistrus aurantiacus is a species of armored catfish native to Brazil and Peru, where it is found in the Ucayali, Tocantins and Xingu Rivers.  This species grows to a length of  SL.

References
 

Ancistrini
Fish of South America
Fish of Brazil
Fish of Peru
Fish described in 1855